The iliacus is a flat, triangular muscle which fills the iliac fossa. It forms the lateral portion of iliopsoas, providing flexion of the thigh and lower limb at the acetabulofemoral joint.

Structure
The iliacus arises from the iliac fossa on the interior side of the hip bone, and also from the region of the anterior inferior iliac spine (AIIS). It joins the psoas major to form the iliopsoas. It proceeds across the iliopubic eminence through the muscular lacuna to its insertion on the lesser trochanter of the femur. Its fibers are often inserted in front of those of the psoas major and extend distally over the lesser trochanter.

Nerve supply
The iliopsoas is innervated by the femoral nerve and direct branches from the lumbar plexus.

Function
In open-chain exercises, as part of the iliopsoas, the iliacus is important for lifting (flexing) the femur forward (e.g. front scale). In closed-chain exercises, the iliopsoas bends the trunk forward and can lift the trunk from a lying posture (e.g. sit-ups, back scale) because the psoas major crosses several vertebral joints and the sacroiliac joint. From its origin in the lesser pelvis the iliacus acts exclusively on the hip joint.

Additional images

Notes

References

External links

 PTCentral
  - "Muscles and nerves of the posterior abdominal wall."
 

Hip flexors
Hip muscles
Iliopsoas muscles
Muscles of the lower limb